Rebecca De Mornay (born Rebecca Jane Pearch; August 29, 1959) is an American actress and producer. Her breakthrough film role came in 1983, when she starred as Lana in Risky Business. De Mornay is also known for her roles in The Slugger's Wife (1985), Runaway Train (1985), The Trip to Bountiful (1985), Backdraft (1991), and The Hand That Rocks the Cradle (1992).

Her other film credits include The Three Musketeers (1993), Never Talk to Strangers (1995), Identity (2003), Lords of Dogtown, Wedding Crashers (both 2005), and Mother's Day (2010). On television, she starred as Wendy Torrance in the miniseries adaptation of The Shining (1997), and as Dorothy Walker on Marvel's Jessica Jones (2015–19).

Early life
De Mornay was born Rebecca Jane Pearch in Santa Rosa, California, the daughter of Julie and Wally George (né George Walter Pearch), a disc jockey and later television host. According to the Associated Press, De Mornay's age is the subject of dispute, though it was announced in Santa Rosa's Press Democrat that her parents had a daughter born on August 29, 1959 at Santa Rosa Memorial Hospital. Her paternal grandmother was vaudeville performer and child film actress Eugenia Clinchard.

Her parents divorced in 1960, and she took the surname of her stepfather, Richard De Mornay, after her mother married him in 1961. She spent her early years in Pasadena, California, until her stepfather died of a stroke on March 2, 1962, aged 48. After his death, De Mornay and her stepbrother were raised by her mother, who relocated the family to Europe, where they lived in several different locations. She attended the independent Summerhill School in Leiston, Suffolk, England before completing her studies at a private high school in Germany.

Career 

By the time she was 16, De Mornay had an agent who was selling her songs to German rock & roll musicians, and she had written the theme song for a kung fu movie called Goodbye Bruce Lee: His Last Game of Death (1975). In 1980, De Mornay returned to the United States and enrolled at the Lee Strasberg Institute to study acting. She made her film debut with a small part in Francis Ford Coppola's 1981 film One from the Heart, which starred her real-life partner at the time, Harry Dean Stanton. Her star-making role came two years later in Risky Business (1983), as a call girl who seduces a high-school student played by Tom Cruise. In 1985, she played the title role in The Slugger's Wife opposite Michael O'Keefe, and co-starred in The Trip to Bountiful and Runaway Train, both of which were nominated for several Academy Awards. That same year, she appeared with Starship's Mickey Thomas in the music video for the song "Sara". The song reached No. 1 on the Billboard Hot 100 chart on March 15, 1986.

She also appeared in Roger Vadim's provocative 1988 remake of And God Created Woman, and as the wife of Kurt Russell's character in Ron Howard's Backdraft (1991). In 1990 she enacted the role of a USAF Captain pilot in HBO's successful Cold War film By the Dawn's Early Light. One of De Mornay's most commercially successful films was the thriller The Hand That Rocks the Cradle, released in 1992. She starred as a defense lawyer in Sidney Lumet's murder drama Guilty as Sin (1993) with Don Johnson. Then she appeared in the 1995 drama film Never Talk to Strangers opposite Antonio Banderas, for which she was also the executive producer.

In 2003, she guest-starred as primary antagonist in the first two episodes of season 2 of Boomtown. In 2004, she guest-starred as attorney Hannah Rose for the last few episodes of The Practice and the following year, had a brief role alongside Owen Wilson and Vince Vaughn in Wedding Crashers. De Mornay also starred in the 2007 drama American Venus.

In June 2007, she appeared in the HBO series John from Cincinnati with a starring role as matriarch of a troubled Imperial Beach, California, surfing family and the grandmother/guardian of a teen surfer on the brink of greatness. She appeared in Darren Lynn Bousman's Mother's Day (2010).

In 2012, De Mornay played the role of Finch's mom in the movie American Reunion where she portrayed an attractive older woman and a love interest of Stifler. From 2015 to 2019, she appeared in Marvel's Jessica Jones as Trish Walker's abusive mother.

Personal life
De Mornay dated actor Harry Dean Stanton in the early 1980s. They met in 1981 on the set of One From the Heart and dated until De Mornay and Tom Cruise began an affair while filming Risky Business in 1982. De Mornay and Cruise broke up in 1985.

De Mornay married writer Bruce Wagner on December 16, 1986; they divorced in 1990.

De Mornay subsequently dated and was briefly engaged to singer Leonard Cohen. She co-produced Cohen's 1992 album The Future, which is also dedicated to her.

De Mornay was in a relationship with actor turned sportcaster Patrick O'Neal. They have two daughters together.

Filmography

Film

Television

Music videos

Notes

References

Sources

Further reading

External links

 
 
 

1959 births
Age controversies
Living people
20th-century American actresses
21st-century American actresses
American film actresses
Film producers from California
American television actresses
Lee Strasberg Theatre and Film Institute alumni
People educated at Summerhill School
Actresses from Santa Rosa, California
American women film producers